Maybe One Day is the debut album of Canadian punk rock band Not by Choice, released on September 3, 2002. Standing All Alone and Now That You Are Leaving were the two singles released from this album. The album debuted at #47 on the Canadian Albums Chart. The album won the CASBY Award for "Favourite New Indie Release".

Track listing

Year-end charts

References

2002 albums
Not by Choice albums
Linus Entertainment albums